Jan Matura (born 29 January 1980) is a Czech former nordic skier competing from 1999 to 2001 and a former ski jumper competing from 2002 to 2017.

Nordic combined 
Matura finished eighth in the 4 × 5 km team event at the 1998 Winter Olympics in Nagano. His best results at the FIS Nordic World Ski Championships was 34th in the 15 km individual at Ramsau in 1999. At the World Cup level, Matura's best finish was ninth in a 15 km individual event in Germany in 1999. In Nordic combined, his overall best career finish was third twice in 7.5 km sprint events (1998, 2000).

Ski jumping world cup 
At the 2006 Winter Olympics in Turin, Matura finished ninth in the team large hill and 21st in the individual normal hill events.

His best FIS Nordic World Ski Championships occurred at Oberstdorf in 2005 where he finished seventh in the team normal hill and 23rd in both individual events. Matura's best finishes at the Ski-flying World Championships occurred at Kulm in 2006 where he finished eighth in the team and 28th in the individual events.

His best individual World Cup result is a double victory in Sapporo on 19 and 20 January 2013.

Standings

Wins

External links 
 Nordic combined team Olympic results: 1988–2002 
 
 

1980 births
Living people
Czech male Nordic combined skiers
Czech male ski jumpers
Nordic combined skiers at the 1998 Winter Olympics
Ski jumpers at the 2002 Winter Olympics
Ski jumpers at the 2006 Winter Olympics
Ski jumpers at the 2014 Winter Olympics
Olympic ski jumpers of the Czech Republic
Olympic Nordic combined skiers of the Czech Republic
People from Český Krumlov
Sportspeople from the South Bohemian Region